John Herman Muray (born 6 June 1978) is an Indonesian former sprinter. He competed in the men's 100 metres at the 2000 Summer Olympics.

References

External links
 

1978 births
Living people
Athletes (track and field) at the 2000 Summer Olympics
Indonesian male sprinters
Olympic athletes of Indonesia
Southeast Asian Games medalists in athletics
Southeast Asian Games silver medalists for Indonesia
Southeast Asian Games bronze medalists for Indonesia
Competitors at the 2003 Southeast Asian Games
Competitors at the 2005 Southeast Asian Games
Competitors at the 2007 Southeast Asian Games
20th-century Indonesian people
21st-century Indonesian people